Thomas Benwell (aka Thomas Benyngwell) was a Master of University College, Oxford, England.

Benwell was a mature commoner and Fellow at University College. He was also a tenant of a College property. He became Master in 1428, a post he held until 1441. He was said to be an eminent preacher according to Thomas Caius, a later Master of the College.

References 

Year of birth missing
Year of death missing
15th-century English people
15th-century scholars
Alumni of University College, Oxford
Fellows of University College, Oxford
Masters of University College, Oxford